Susan Napier (born 14 February 1954 in Auckland, New Zealand) was a popular New Zealand writer of over 30 romance novels in various Mills & Boon category lines since 1984.

Biography
Napier worked as a reporter at the newspaper Auckland Star, where she met her future husband, Chief Reporter Tony Potter. They had two sons, Simon and Ben.

Over 30 of her novels have been published, and they have been translated into a combined 20 languages. Romantic Times has described her work as "multi-layered" with "well-defined characters and a commanding conflict."  She has twice been nominated for a Romantic Times Reviewer's Choice Award, in 1996 for Reckless Conduct, and in 1997 for Mistress of the Groom.

Bibliography

Single novels
 Sweet Vixen, 1984
 Sweet As My Revenge, 1985
 The Counterfeit Secretary, 1986
 The Lonely Season, 1986
 Reasons Of The Heart, 1988
 Another Time, 1989
 The Love Conspiracy, 1990
 Bewitching Compulsion, 1990
 Fortune's Mistress, 1991
 No Reprieve, 1991
 Deal Of A Lifetime, 1992
 Devil To Pay, 1992
 Tempt Me Not, 1993
 The Hawk And The Lamb, 1994
 The Cruellest Lie, 1994
 Phantom Lover, 1994
 Savage Courtship, 1995
 The Sister Swap, 1996
 Breaking/Making Up: Vendetta, 1997
 Mistress of the Groom, 1997
 In Bed With The Boss, 1999
 The Revenge Affair, 1999
 The Mistress Deception, 2000
 Secret Seduction, 2000
 A Passionate Proposition, 2001
 Mistress For A Weekend, 2006
 Accidental Mistress, 2007
 Price of Passion (alternate title Just Once), 2008
 Public Scandal,Private Mistress, 2008

The Marlows Series
 Love In The Valley, 1985
 True Enchanter, 1988
 Winter of Dreams, 1993
 A Lesson In Seduction, 1997

Year Down Under Series Multi-Author
Secret Admirer, 1993

9 to 5 Series Multi-Author
Reckless Conduct, 1996

Do Not Disturb Series Multi-Author
Honeymoon Baby, 1998

References and resources

See also
 List of romantic novelists

New Zealand women novelists
New Zealand romantic fiction writers
Living people
1954 births
20th-century New Zealand novelists
21st-century New Zealand novelists
Women romantic fiction writers
21st-century New Zealand women writers
20th-century New Zealand women writers